Drejček in trije Marsovčki is a novel by Slovenian author Vid Pečjak. It was first published in 1961.

See also
List of Slovenian novels

Slovenian novels
1961 novels